Thomas J. Grebis (December 21, 1930 – January 24, 2005) was an American football player and coach.
He served as the head football coach at Drexel University from 1961 to 1968, compiling a record of 39–24–2. Grebis played college football at Drexel as a halfback and was co-captain of the 1953 Drexel Dragons football team. Grebis was a member of Drexel's faculty and taught chemistry. He was an assistant football coach at Drexel for four season before succeeding Jack Hinkle at head coach in 1961.

Head coaching record

References

External links
 Drexel Hall of Fame profile
 

1930 births
2005 deaths
American football halfbacks
Drexel Dragons football coaches
Drexel Dragons football players
Drexel University faculty
People from Somerset County, Pennsylvania
Coaches of American football from Pennsylvania
Players of American football from Pennsylvania